Parroquia de San Pedro Apostol is a church in Zapopan, in the Mexican state of Jalisco.

References

External links

Churches in Mexico
Zapopan